Immigration is the fifth album of the Japanese rock group Show-Ya. The album was released on 5 November 1987 in Japan. Yasushi Akimoto and Kyōhei Tsutsumi worked together again in song composition. Makoto Matsushita arranged all the music, this time collaborating with the band. This album was mixed by Andy Johns in Los Angeles. Immigration peaked at position No. 12 in the Japanese Oricon chart.

Track listing
Side one
"Dare Mo Wakara Nakute Ii (Toki no Wana)" (誰もわからなくていい　―時の罠―) (Miki Igarashi, Yasushi Akimoto) – 4:32
"Mizu no Naka no Toubousha (U.S.A. Version)" (水の中の逃亡者 (U.S.A.バージョン）) (Kyōhei Tsutsumi, Akimoto) – 3:59
"Free Birds" (Satomi Senba & Miki Tsunoda, Keiko Terada) – 3:54
"Uso Da To Itte Yo, Moon Light" (嘘だと言ってよMoon Light) (Tsutsumi, Akimoto) – 4:45
"3 Dome no Christmas" (3度目のクリスマス) (Tsutsumi, Akimoto) – 4:34

Side two
"Kodoku no Meiro (Labyrinth)" (孤独の迷路（ラビリンス）) (Tsutsumi, Akimoto) – 4:52
"Origination ～" (Miki Nakamura) – 0:47
"That Was Then, This Is Now" (Terada) – 4:03
"Be Quiet!!!" (Terada, Akimoto) – 6:52
"2000 Mairu no Koi" (2000マイルの恋) (Tsutsumi, Akimoto) – 5:02

CD edition bonus track
"Spider 23" (Terada) – 4:08

Personnel

Band members
Keiko Terada – vocals
Miki Igarashi – guitars
Miki Nakamura – keyboards
Satomi Senba – bass
Miki Tsunoda – drums

Production
Yoshikazu Nakabayashi, Nobuo Maeda, Satoru Kawaguchi – engineers
Yoshiaki Kennmochi, Nobuo Namie, Ikuo Honma – assistant engineers
Andy Johns, Paul Wertheimer – mixing at Ameraycan Studio, Hollywood, California
Terry Dunavan – mastering at Amigo Studios, Hollywood, California

References

External links
Show-Ya discography 
"Mizu no Naka no Toubousha" video clip

Show-Ya albums
1987 albums
EMI Records albums
Japanese-language albums